Clypeobarbus bomokandi is a species of ray-finned fish in the genus Clypeobarbus from the Congo Basin.

References 

 

Clypeobarbus
Fish described in 1924